Dominick Muermans (born 17 July 1984 in Geleen, Netherlands) is a Dutch racing driver.

Dominick raced full-time in the Atlantic Championship in the 2008 season.

Since 2008, he has raced in the Superleague Formula, in the 2008 season he raced for Al Ain in the Italian round and in the 2009 season he was driver for PSV Eindhoven in the first half of the season before being replaced by Carlo van Dam.

Motorsports Career Results

Career summary

† - Team standings.

Superleague Formula

2008-2009
(Races in bold indicate pole position) (Races in italics indicate fastest lap)

2009 Super Final Results
Super Final results in 2009 did not count for points towards the main championship.

References

External links 
 Official website
 Driver Database information

1984 births
Living people
Dutch racing drivers
Superleague Formula drivers
International Formula Master drivers
Atlantic Championship drivers
German Formula Three Championship drivers
British Formula Three Championship drivers
Formula 3 Euro Series drivers
Dutch Formula Renault 2.0 drivers
German Formula Renault 2.0 drivers
Nordic Formula Renault 2.0 drivers
People from Geleen
Sportspeople from Limburg (Netherlands)
Ombra Racing drivers
Van Amersfoort Racing drivers